Gert-Dietmar Klause (born 25 March 1945) is a former East German cross-country skier who competed at three Olympic Games from 1968 to 1976. He won a silver medal in the 50 km at the 1976 Winter Olympics in Innsbruck.

Klause won two medals in the 4 x 10 km relay at the FIS Nordic World Ski Championships (gold: 1974, silver: 1970.) His best individual finish was a 4th in the 15 km in 1970.

In 1975, he won Vasaloppet as the first and only East German winner (and the first non-Scandinavian winner).

Cross-country skiing results
All results are sourced from the International Ski Federation (FIS).

Olympic Games
 1 medal – (1 silver)

World Championships
 2 medals – (1 gold, 1 silver)

References

External links
 

1945 births
Living people
People from Auerbach (Vogtland)
Sportspeople from Saxony
Cross-country skiers at the 1968 Winter Olympics
Cross-country skiers at the 1972 Winter Olympics
Cross-country skiers at the 1976 Winter Olympics
Vasaloppet winners
Olympic medalists in cross-country skiing
East German male cross-country skiers
FIS Nordic World Ski Championships medalists in cross-country skiing
Medalists at the 1976 Winter Olympics
Olympic silver medalists for East Germany
Universiade medalists in cross-country skiing
Universiade bronze medalists for East Germany
Competitors at the 1970 Winter Universiade
Olympic cross-country skiers of East Germany